Civic Alternative or Bourgeois Alternative (in Danish: Borgerligt Alternativ) is a local political party in Hørsholm, Denmark. BA was launched by a local Venstre personality, Ib Lunde Rasmussen, who felt dissatisfied with the local Venstre leadership.

In the 2005 municipal elections the party got 352 votes (2.6%), but no seat in the municipal council.

References

External links 
 

Local political parties in Denmark
Political parties with year of establishment missing